Ghumne Mechmathi Andho Manche is a 1969 Nepali-language poetry collection by Bhupi Sherchan. It was published by Sajha Prakashan and won the first ever Sajha Puraskar for the year 2025 BS (1969).

Background 
The poems were first published as individual short poems over time, on periodicals like Ruprekha. The poems are highly informed by national and international political and social issues of the time, and are interpreted as protest literature.

Reception 
It is considered the poet's magnum opus, and argued to be on par with Muna Madan by Laxmi Prasad Devkota and Madhav Prasad Ghimire's Gauri. Prominent critic Taranath Sharma, litterateur Basu Rimal Yatri, Yadu Nath Khanal, and Hiramani Sharma Paudyal, were among the critics who published positive reviews on the work. 

The book was awarded with the Sajha Puraskar by Sajha Prakashan in 2026 BS.

Adaptation 
The title of 2022 Nepali film, Chiso Ashtray is based on one of the poem from the collection.

See also 

 Muna Madan
 Abstract Chintan Pyaj
 Shirishko Phool

References

1968 books
Nepalese poetry collections
Nepalese books
Sajha Puraskar-winning works
1968 poetry books